Geldof is a surname. Notable people with the surname include:

 Bob Geldof (born 1951), Irish singer, songwriter, author, and political activist
 Peaches Geldof (1989-2014), British model and presenter and journalist, daughter of Bob Geldof
 Pixie Geldof (born 1990), British model and singer, daughter of Bob Geldof

See also 
 Geldoff, a fictional character in Marvel Comics
 Gandalf
 Gandolf